Dhar district is a district of Madhya Pradesh state in central India. The historic town of Dhar is administrative headquarters of the district.

The district has an area 8,153 km2. It is bounded by the districts of Ratlam to the north, Ujjain to the northeast, Indore to the east, Khargone (West Nimar) to the southeast, Barwani to the south, Jhabua and Alirajpur to the west. It is part of the Indore Division of Madhya Pradesh. The population of the district is 2,185,793 (2011 census), an increase of 25.60% from its 2001 population of 1,740,329. Pithampur is a large industrial area comes under Dhar District. Kukshi is the largest tehsil of the district.

Geography
The Vindhya Range runs east and west through the district. The northern part of the district lies on the Malwa plateau. The northwestern portion of the district lies in the watershed of the Mahi River and its tributaries, while the northeastern part of the district lies in the watershed of the Chambal River, which drains into the Ganges via the Yamuna River. The portion of the district south of the ridge of the Vindhyas lies in the watershed of the Narmada River, which forms the southern boundary of the district.

Divisions
Dhar district is divided into 6 sub-divisions: Dhar, Sardarpur, Badnawar, Manawar, Kukshi and Dharampuri (Newly Added). These sub-divisions are further divided into 8 tehsils: Dhar, Badnawar, Dharampuri, Sardarpur, Manawar, Kukshi, Dahi and Gandhwani.

There are seven Vidhan Sabha constituencies in this district: Sardarpur, Gandhwani, Kukshi, Manawar, Dharampuri, Dhar and Badnawar. All of these are part of the only Lok Sabha constituency in this district : Dhar Lok Sabha Constituency.

Demographics

According to the 2011 census Dhar District has a population of 2,185,793, roughly equal to the nation of Latvia or the US state of New Mexico. This gives it a ranking of 208th in India (out of a total of 640). Its population growth rate over the decade 2001-2011 was  25.53%. Dhar has a sex ratio of 961 females for every 1000 males, and a literacy rate of 60.57%. 18.90% of the population lives in urban areas. Scheduled Castes and Scheduled Tribes made up 6.65% and 55.94% of the population respectively.

At the time of the 2011 Census of India, 51.28% of the population in the district spoke Hindi, 15.62% Malvi, 15.29% Nimadi, 11.49% Bhili and 3.87% Bhilali as their first language.

References

External links

Dhar district web site

Districts of Madhya Pradesh